Rawiri is the name of:

Surname 
Angèle Rawiri (1954–2010), Gabonese novelist
Georges Rawiri (1932–2006), Gabonese politician, diplomat, and poet

Given name 
Rawiri Paratene, New Zealand actor, director, and writer
Rawiri Puhirake (died 1864), New Zealand tribal leader
 Rawiri Taiwhanga, New Zealand tribal leader, farmer, Anglican missionary and teacher
Rawiri Tareahi (died 1850s), New Zealand tribal leader